The 1924 Dayton Triangles season was their fifth in the league. The team improved on their previous output of 1–6–1. They finished thirteenth in the league.

Schedule

Standings

References

Dayton Triangles seasons
Dayton Triangles
Dayton Triangles